Club Dorados de Tijuana, also known as Dorados de Tijuana or simply Dorados, was a professional club football Mexico subsidiary of the Dorados de Sinaloa.

History
The team was bought by the Dorados de Sinaloa end of 2005; previous eleventh was known simply as the Club Tijuana. The team had a bad season and dragged the problem of percentage of the old franchise, so it was relegated to Segunda División de México, before being transferred to the city of Mazatlan and being renamed Dorados de Mazatlán.

Stadium

Previous Teams
The following teams were once in Tijuana and how disappeared since their franchise was purchased or relegated to Segunda División de México:

 Club Tijuana: Changed owner and renamed Dorados de Tijuana.
 Nacional Tijuana.
 Chivas Tijuana: Subsidiary of Chivas.
 Trotamundos Tijuana: Converted to Trotamundos Salamanca.
 Tijuana Stars.
 Inter Tijuana.

International Tournaments

Dorados de Tijuana has played games against Mexico U-20 national team Sub-20 in Ensenada, also some games against Gauchos de San Diego.

Statistics Primera Division 'A'
GP 19; W:4; T:4; L:11; GF 13; GA 30
In their only season in Clausura 2006.

External links
Sitio Web oficial
Página de la porra de Dorados

Footnotes

Defunct football clubs in Mexico
Ascenso MX teams
Sports teams in Tijuana